Kavalkinaru is a village panchayat in the Tirunelveli district of Tamil Nadu. It is located 24 km (15 Miles) from Nagercoil,  69 km (43 Miles) from Tirunelveli, and 99 km from Trivandrum International Airport. The nearest port, Tuticorin Port Trust, (also known as V.O.Chidambaram Port), is 111 km from Kavalkinaru.  The town, once dependent on agriculture, livestock, stone mining, flower cultivation and the processing of Borassus (Palmyra Tree – பனை மரம்), is now embracing new technologies and professions. The high tunneling-effect of the Western Ghats has enabled this region to be a major Wind Power generation area for India, with thousands of windmills. There are also the test facilities for ISRO Propulsion Complex, a part of Indian Space Research Organisation (ISRO), on the lower slopes of the Mahendragiri mountain near Kavalkinaru.

History
Kavalkinaru has its roots in the early Dravidian Civilization and its history can be traced from the early 17th century (around 1698 A.D). This region was predominantly ruled by the majestic Pandyan Dynasty; as their kingdom was established from the south of Kaveri River till Kanyakumari. The name originated from the well which provided fresh water for the soldiers of the Cheras, Cholas and Pandiyas Kingdom, which is still preserved in the town.

Annual feast

The church feast is annually celebrated on 15 May with Flag Hoisting and there is a Car-Procession on the 9th Day of the celebration. On the 11th day there is a Common Meal served at the church with the congregation of all the people and to bid their final prayers. Many pitch up stalls selling sweets, cosmetic items and toys. Many entertainment fixtures like Giant Wheel & Carousel (Merry-Go-Round) are set for entertainment during the feast days.

Kavalkinaru Junction
Kavalkinaru Junction adds to Kavakinaru's growth in many ways. National Highway 44, which connects Varanasi and Kanyakumari, bypasses through the center of this junction, making it a trade point in the entire region. Almost all basic facilities can be availed from the junction. 

There is a vegetable market, 'Kamaraj Market', situated besides the Junction, which attracts traders from all the regions of Tamil Nadu, making it a prime hub for trade and distribution to the Tirunelveli district and vegetables are loaded to adjacent states of Kerala.

Landmarks

As Kavalkinaru is set in the high tunneling-effect region in the Western Ghats it has enabled this entire region to be a huge Wind Power generation region in India. Hence, there are thousands of Windmills deployed in this region to generate safe energy. The Central Government of India has constructed the test facilities for ISRO Propulsion Complex, a part of Indian Space Research Organisation (ISRO), on the lower slopes of the Mahendragiri mountain near Kavalkinaru. 

Kavalkinaru has a well constructed Railway Station (now defunct) where the Chennai-Kanyakumari line runs on; passenger trains used to stop at Kavalkinaru Railway Station in its early days.

There are two ponds in Kavalkinaru both the ponds usually are full during the Monsoon, these ponds are not used for drinking water but they are used for irrigation and cleaning the Cattle.

Indian National Congress leader and the former chief minister of Tamil Nadu Bharat Ratna K. Kamaraj, has two statues, one in the centre of their landscape and the other statue at Kavalkinaru Junction.

Notable People
The growth of the village is also supported by local leaders like M. Appavu. The other M.L.A of this region is S. Michael Rayappan a film producer by producing films like "Naadodigal", "Goripalayam" and "Sindhusamaveli" under Global Infotainments banner. Tamil movie Kovil (film) was also shot in Kavalkinaru and in its Sacred Heart Church.

References
 "Modern flower market to be opened today - The Hindu"
 Kavalkinaru (Facebook Account)

Cities and towns in Tirunelveli district